Andy Marino may refer to:

 Andy Marino (British writer), British biographer
 Andy Marino (American writer) (born 1980), American writer of young-adult fiction